Thomas Raymond Brady (3 June 1937 – 15 November 2016) was an Irish international footballer who played in England in the late 1950s and early 1960s with Millwall and Queens Park Rangers.

Brady signed for Millwall from Transport F.C. in July 1957. He then signed for QPR in July 1963 and made his debut in August of that year against Charlton Athletic. In all Brady made 88 league appearances for QPR.

His brother Pat played for Millwall from 1959 until he too joined QPR in 1963, and his other brothers Liam and Frank were also professional footballers. His great uncle Frank Brady Sr. was also an Irish international.

Brady won six full caps for the Republic of Ireland in 1963 and 1964. He died on 15 November 2016, at the age of 79.

After retiring from football, he purchased a public house "The Railway and Bicycle" in Sevenoaks, Kent, where he was well known as a local character.

Honours
 Football League Fourth Division (fourth tier)
 Millwall F.C. 1961-62

References

 The Complete Who's Who of Irish International Football, 1945-96 (1996):Stephen McGarrigle

1937 births
2016 deaths
League of Ireland players
Republic of Ireland association footballers
Republic of Ireland international footballers
Queens Park Rangers F.C. players
Millwall F.C. players
Association footballers from County Dublin
Hastings United F.C. (1948) players
St Patrick's Athletic F.C. players
Home Farm F.C. players
English Football League players
Association football defenders
Transport F.C. players
Ray